Elmer William Valo (March 5, 1921 – July 19, 1998), born Imrich Valo, was a Slovak American professional baseball right fielder, coach, and scout in Major League Baseball (MLB). He batted left-handed and threw right-handed.

Early years
A native of Rybník, Czechoslovakia, Valo emigrated to the United States with his family at the age of six.

Career

Valo played for Federalsburg of the Eastern Shore League in 1939, and for Wilmington in the Interstate League in 1940.

Valo's big-league playing career was affected by three franchise relocations. Valo spent his first 13 seasons in the majors with the Philadelphia A's, then accompanied the team to Kansas City when the club moved after the 1954 season. Valo moved with the Brooklyn Dodgers to Los Angeles after the 1957 season. And after playing for the Washington Senators in 1960, the franchise relocated and Valo found himself playing for the Minnesota Twins.

He was a hustling player and an aggressive line-drive hitter who hit .300 or better five times, with a career-high .364 in 1955. As a right fielder, he was noted for his fearless manner in challenging fences, and occasionally crashed through an outfield wall in pursuit of a ball.

As Valo's career moved into its final phase, he became an outstanding pinch-hitter. He used his strike zone judgment to post an on-base percentage over .400 in eight of the ten seasons (.414 from 1946 to 1955). In 1960, Valo set major-league pinch-hitting season records for games, walks and times on base. He also set a major-league career record with 91 walks as a pinch-hitter.

Notable games
Valo stated that he had a plate appearance for Philadelphia on September 30, 1939. If true, Valo would join Ted Williams, Mickey Vernon, and Early Wynn as the only four-decade players of the 1930s to the 1960s. The box score for the game does not list Valo — he claimed that he was left out by the official scorer, as he was not under contract with Philadelphia at the time.

On May 1, 1949, Valo became the first major league player to hit two bases-loaded triples in a game. The feat has been matched only by Bill Bruton (1959) and Duane Kuiper (1978). Valo added another bases-loaded triple that year, matching the major league record of three in a season, which was originally set by Shano Collins in 1918.

Valo hit for the cycle on August 2, 1950.

Later years
Following his retirement as a player, Valo worked with the Indians' organization as a major league coach and minor league manager, and served as a scout for the Phillies for 13 years, until his death. He was inducted into the Philadelphia Baseball Wall of Fame in 1990. Valo died in Palmerton, Pennsylvania, at the age of 77 in 1998.

See also
 List of Major League Baseball players to hit for the cycle

References

Further reading

External links

Elmer Valo at SABR (Baseball BioProject)
Elmer Valo at Baseball Almanac
Elmer Valo at Baseballbiography.com
Elmer Valo Brooklyn Dodgers Photo
 Elmer Valo at The Deadball Era

1921 births
1998 deaths
American people of Slovak descent
Major League Baseball players from Slovakia
Brooklyn Dodgers players
Cleveland Indians players
Cleveland Indians coaches
Czechoslovak baseball players
Federalsburg A's players
Kansas City Athletics players
Los Angeles Dodgers players
Major League Baseball first base coaches
Major League Baseball right fielders
Minnesota Twins players
New York Mets scouts
New York Yankees players
Philadelphia Athletics players
Philadelphia Phillies players
Philadelphia Phillies scouts
Seattle Rainiers players
Washington Senators (1901–1960) players
Wilmington Blue Rocks (1940–1952) players
Minor league baseball managers
Czechoslovak emigrants to the United States
People from Rybnik